Jaipur Municipal Corporation or Jaipur Nagar Nigam is municipal corporation of Jaipur city in Rajasthan state in India. Jaipur Municipal Corporation is responsible for maintaining the city's civic infrastructure and carrying out associated administrative duties. The Municipal Corporation is headed by a mayor. There are 250 wards and each ward is represented by an elected member. Jaipur Development Authority (JDA) is the nodal government agency responsible for the planning and development of Jaipur. Jaipur consists of two parliamentary constituencies Jaipur and Jaipur Rural. Shri Mohan Lal Gupta was the first mayor of Jaipur Nagar Nigam in the year 1994.

Jaipur Municipal Corporation Heritage 
There are 100 wards in the Heritage Jaipur divided into 5 zones:
 Amer comprises ward No. 1 to 4
 Hawa Mahal comprises ward No. 5 to 30
 Civil Lines comprises ward No. 31 to 54
 Kishanpole comprises ward No. 55 to 75
 Adarsh Nagar comprises ward No. 75 to 100

Jaipur Municipal Corporation Greater 
There are 150 wards in the Greater Jaipur divided into 5 zones:
 Vidyadhar Nagar comprises ward No. 1 to 42
Jhotwara comprises ward No. 43 to 64
Sanganer comprises ward No. 65 to 103
Bagru comprises ward No. 104 to 124
Malviya Nagar comprises ward No. 125 to 150

See also
 Jaipur
 Jaipur State
 List of world's biggest cities

References

External links
http://jaipurmc.org
http://jaipurmcheritage.org

Municipal corporations in Rajasthan
1888 establishments in India
Government of Jaipur